Dimitra Fimi (born 2 June 1978) is a Scottish academic and writer and since 2020 the Senior Lecturer in Fantasy and Children's Literature at the University of Glasgow. Her research includes that of the writings of J. R. R. Tolkien and children's fantasy literature.

Biography

Early life 
From the island of Salamis in the Greek region of Attica, the daughter of teachers Pavlos Fimis and Theodora Papaliveriou-Fimi, she attended the 1st General Lyceum of Salamis from where she graduated in 1996. Fimi gained her BA degree at the University of Athens in 2000 before completing her MA in Early Celtic Studies (2002) and PhD in English Literature (2005) at Cardiff University.

Career 
From 2009 to 2018 she was among the staff of Cardiff Metropolitan University as a lecturer in English after having previously lectured for Cardiff University and the Open University. In September 2018 she was appointed Lecturer in Fantasy and Children's Literature at the University of Glasgow, the first time the term “fantasy” has ever been used in an academic post title in the UK. In the summer of 2020 she was promoted to Senior Lecturer in Fantasy and Children's Literature.

Fimi has contributed chapters in A Companion to J.R.R. Tolkien (Blackwell, 2014), and Revisiting Imaginary Worlds: A Subcreation Studies Anthology (Routledge, 2016). She is a member of The Tolkien Society and has written articles for magazines and websites including Times Literary Supplement (TLS) and The Conversation; she appears regularly on BBC Radio Wales.

In September 2020 she was appointed Co-Director of the Centre for Fantasy and the Fantastic at the University of Glasgow.

Tolkien and race

Her doctoral thesis on the vexed issue of Tolkien and race was published as the monograph Tolkien, Race and Cultural History (Palgrave Macmillan, 2008) and won the Mythopoeic Scholarship Award for Inklings Studies in 2010 in addition to being shortlisted for the Katharine Briggs Folklore Award. With Andrew Higgins she is co-editor of A Secret Vice: Tolkien on Invented Languages (HarperCollins, 2016) which won the Tolkien Society Award for Best Book in 2017. Her other works include  Celtic Myth in Contemporary Children’s Fantasy (Palgrave Macmillan, 2017) which was the runner-up for the Katharine Briggs Folklore Award. Fimi lectures on fantasy and children's literature. She was one of the judges of the Wales Book of the Year Award 2017 and was also selected for the Welsh Crucible in 2017. Fimi is a Visiting Lecturer in English Literature at Signum University, an online learning facility.

References

External links
 

1978 births
People from Salamis Island
National and Kapodistrian University of Athens alumni
Alumni of Cardiff University
Academics of Cardiff University
Academics of the Open University
Academics of the University of Glasgow
People associated with Cardiff Metropolitan University
Tolkien studies
Tolkien Society members
Greek academics
Living people
Greek emigrants to the United Kingdom